Dead on Target (also titled Our Man Flint: Dead On Target) is an American television film. The film originally aired on ABC on March 17, 1976, and was shot in Vancouver, British Columbia. The was a backdoor pilot for a possible weekly series, but it was not picked up to series, and it became the last Derek Flint movie. Ray Danton replaces James Coburn as Derek Flint, who is now a private detective and former Z.O.W.I.E. government agent. The cast also includes Sharon Acker, Susan Sullivan, Lawrence Dane, Gay Rowan, Linda Woods, Donnelly Rhodes, and Kim Cattrall.

Plot
Derek Flint agrees to teach a pretty young woman named Benita Ryders (Gay Rowan) how to be a private eye. Their first mission together has them facing a group of terrorists called B.E.S.L.A. ("Bar El Sol Liberation Army"), who have kidnapped an oil executive. They rescue him and put B.E.S.L.A. out of business.

Home media
Dead On Target was released by Fox as part of the "Ultimate Flint Collection " DVD set.

External links 
 

1976 television films
1976 films
ABC network original films
American television films
Films shot in Vancouver
Television pilots not picked up as a series
Films directed by Joseph L. Scanlan
1970s English-language films